Francis Lumsden Hare (17 October 1874 – 28 August 1964) was an Irish-born film and theatre actor. He was also a theatre director and theatrical producer.

Early years 
Hare studied at St. Dunstan's College in London.

Career 

Hare appeared in more than 35 Broadway productions between 1900 and 1942. In 1908 he first appeared on Broadway in the hit play What Every Woman Knows starring Maude Adams. He served as director and/or producer for various productions, some starring himself.

He started appearing in films in 1916. By his last screen appearance in 1961, Hare had appeared in more than 140 films and over a dozen television productions.

Personal life and death 
Hare was married to actress Selene Johnson. He died 28 August 1964, aged 89, in Beverly Hills, California.

Complete filmography

 

Love's Crucible (1916 short) as Stephen Wright
As in a Looking Glass (1916) as Andrew Livingston
 The Test (1916) as Arthur Thome
 Arms and the Woman (1916) as David Fravoe
Envy (1917) as Stanton Skinner
Barbary Sheep (1917) as Sir Claude Wyverne
The Seven Deadly Sins (1917) as Stanton Skinner (Envy)
National Red Cross Pageant (1917) as The Archbishop of Canterbury - English episode
The Light Within (1918) as Clinton Durand
The Avalanche (1919) as Price Ruyler
 The Country Cousin (1919) as Archie Gore
Mothers of Men (1920) as Capt. Von Pfaffen
 The Blue Pearl (1920) as Holland Webb
Children Not Wanted (1920) as Marcus Hazzard
The Frisky Mrs. Johnson (1920) as Frank Morley
Thoughtless Women (1920) as John Hewitt, The Banker
The Education of Elizabeth (1921) as Thomas
Sherlock Holmes (1922) as Dr. Leighton
On the Banks of the Wabash (1923) as Paul Bixler
Second Youth (1924) as James Remmick
One Way Street (1925) as Sir Edward Hutton
Fugitives (1929) as Uncle Ned
Girls Gone Wild (1929) as Tom Holworthy
The Black Watch (1929) as Colonel of the Black Watch
Salute (1929) as Rear Admiral John Randall
The Sky Hawk (1929) as Judge Allan
Crazy That Way (1930) as Mr. Jordan
So This Is London (1930) as Lord Percy Worthing
Scotland Yard (1930) as Sir Clive Heathcote
Under Suspicion (1930) as Freil
Charlie Chan Carries On (1931) as Inspector Hayley
Svengali (1931) as Monsieur Taffy
Always Goodbye (1931) as Blake
The Road to Singapore (1931) as Mr. Wey-Smith
Arrowsmith (1931) as Sir Robert Fairland - Governor
The Silent Witness (1932) as Colonel Grayson
Devil's Lottery (1932) as Inspector Avery
The White Sister (1933) as Commander (uncredited)
International House (1933) as Sir Mortimer Fortescue
College Humor (1933) as College President
His Double Life (1933) as Oxford
Man of Two Worlds (1934) as Captain Swan
The House of Rothschild (1934) as Prince Regent
Black Moon (1934) as John Macklin
The World Moves On (1934) as Gabriel Warburton (1825) / Sir John Warburton (1914)
Outcast Lady (1934) as Guy
The Little Minister (1934) as Tammas Whammond
The Lives of a Bengal Lancer (1935) as Sgt. Clark
Clive of India (1935) as Maj. Gen. Sir Thomas Woodley
Folies Bergère de Paris (1935) as Gustave
Cardinal Richelieu (1935) as Gustavus Adolphus - King of Sweden
Lady Tubbs (1935) as Lord Abernathy
She (1935) as Dugmore (uncredited)
The Crusades (1935) as Robert - Earl of Leicester
The Bishop Misbehaves (1935) as Constable
Freckles (1935) as James McLean
The Three Musketeers (1935) as Captain de Treville
The Great Impersonation (1935) as Duke Henry
Professional Soldier (1935) as Paul Valdis
Under Two Flags (1936) as Lord Seraph
The Princess Comes Across (1936) as Detective Cragg
The Last of the Mohicans (1936) as General Abercrombie
The Charge of the Light Brigade (1936) as Col. Woodward (uncredited)
Lloyd's of London (1936) as Capt. Suckling
The Last of Mrs. Cheyney (1937) as Inspector Witherspoon
Parnell (1937) as Editor (uncredited)
The Life of Emile Zola (1937) as Mr. Richards
The Littlest Diplomat (1937 short) as Colonel Hardwick
Life Begins with Love (1937) as Col. William Addington Drake III
A Christmas Carol (1938) as Man Discussing Scrooge's Funeral (uncredited)
Gunga Din (1939) as Major Mitchell
Captain Fury (1939) as Mr. Bailey
The Giant of Norway (1939, Short) as Fridtjof Nansen (uncredited)
Northwest Passage (1940) as Lord Amherst
Rebecca (1940) as Mr. Tabbs
A Dispatch from Reuter's (1940) as Chairman
Hudson's Bay (1941) as Capt. Alan MacKinnon (uncredited)
Shadows on the Stairs (1941) as Inspector
More Trifles of Importance (1941 short) as Duke (uncredited)
One Night in Lisbon (1941) as Doorman (uncredited)
Dr. Jekyll and Mr. Hyde (1941) as Colonel Weymouth
Passage from Hong Kong (1941) as Inspector Bray
The Blonde from Singapore (1941) as Reginald Belvin
Suspicion (1941) as Inspector Hodgson (uncredited)
Confirm or Deny (1941) as Sir Titus Scott, Penzance Chronicle
This Above All (1942) as First Headwaiter (uncredited)
The Greatest Gift (1942, Short) as Father Cyprian (uncredited)
Random Harvest (1942) as Sir John (uncredited)
The Gorilla Man (1943) as General Randall Devon
London Blackout Murders (1943) as Supt. Neil
Forever and a Day (1943) as Fitch
Mission to Moscow (1943) as Lord Chilston (uncredited)
The Man from Down Under (1943) as Government Official at Train Station (uncredited)
Holy Matrimony (1943) as Benson, Lady Vale's footman (uncredited)
Jack London (1943) as English Correspondent
Madame Curie (1943) as Professor Roget (uncredited)
The Lodger (1944) as Dr. Sheridan (uncredited)
Passport to Destiny (1944) as Freighter Captain Mack
The White Cliffs of Dover (1944) as The Vicar (uncredited)
The Canterville Ghost (1944) as Mr. Potts
The Keys of the Kingdom (1944) as Daniel Glennie (scenes cut)
Jungle Queen (1945) as Mr. 'X'
The Picture of Dorian Gray (1945) as Thornton (uncredited)
The Valley of Decision (1945) as Dr. McClintock (uncredited)
Love Letters (1945) as Mr. Quinton (uncredited)
Captain Kidd (1945) as Lord Fallsworth (uncredited)
The Green Years (1946) as Lawyer McKellar (uncredited)
Sister Kenny (1946) as Dr. Shadrack (uncredited)
It Happened in Brooklyn (1947) as Canon Green (uncredited)
The Private Affairs of Bel Ami (1947) as Mayor of Canteleu
The Imperfect Lady (1947) as Hardy (uncredited)
Ivy (1947) as Dr. Lanchester (uncredited)
The Secret Life of Walter Mitty (1947) as Dr. Pritchard-Mitford (uncredited)
Green Dolphin Street (1947) as Anderson (uncredited)
The Exile (1947) as Roundhead General
The Paradine Case (1947) as Courtroom Attendant (uncredited)
The Swordsman (1948) as Rev. Douglas (uncredited)
Mr. Peabody and the Mermaid (1948) as Colonel Mandrake
Hills of Home (1948) as Lord Kilspindie
The Fighting O'Flynn (1949) as The Viceroy
Challenge to Lassie (1948) as MacFarland
That Forsyte Woman (1949) as Roger Forsyte
Fortunes of Captain Blood (1950) as Tom Mannering
Rogues of Sherwood Forest (1950) as Warwick (uncredited)
David and Bathsheba (1951) as Old Shepherd (uncredited)
Dick Turpin's Ride (1951) as Sir Robert Walpole
The Desert Fox: The Story of Rommel (1951) as Doctor (uncredited)
5 Fingers (1952) as Member of Parliament (uncredited)
And Now Tomorrow (1952)
Diplomatic Courier (1952) as Jacks (uncredited)
My Cousin Rachel (1952) as Tamblyn (uncredited)
Rogue's March (1953) as President (uncredited)
Julius Caesar (1953) as Publius
Young Bess (1953) as Archbishop Cranmer
Crusade to Liberty (1954 TV movie) 
Rose Marie (1954) as The Judge (uncredited)
King Richard and the Crusaders (1954) as Physician (uncredited)
The First Mintmaster (1955 TV movie) as Gov. Winthrop
Battle Cry (1955) as New Zealander in Bar (uncredited)
The Finest Gift (1955 TV movie) as Ambassador Wakefield
Johnny Tremain (1957) as Adm. Montagu
Count Your Blessings (1959) as John
The Oregon Trail (1959) as Sir Richard Wallingham, British Ambassador (uncredited)
The Four Skulls of Jonathan Drake (1959) as Rogers
Alcoa Presents: One Step Beyond - (1959) as Judge ('Doomsday', episode) - Season 2, Episode 4. (Broadcast U.S., October 13th).

References

External links

AllMovie.com.biography

Lumsden Hare with Elsie Ferguson in the 1919 silent film The Avalanche
Lumsden Hare bio (Aveleyman)

1874 births
1964 deaths
Irish male film actors
Irish male silent film actors
Irish emigrants to the United States (before 1923)
Irish male stage actors
People from County Tipperary
20th-century Irish male actors